The 1981 Fort Lauderdale Strikers season was the fifth season of the Fort Lauderdale Striker's team, and the club's fifteenth season in professional soccer.  This year the team made it to semifinals of the North American Soccer League playoffs.

Competitions

NASL regular season

Results summaries

Results by round

Match reports

NASL Playoffs

First round
<small>#Due to a scheduling conflict between the Calgary Boomers and the Billy Graham Crusade, the Fort Lauderdale Strikers hosted both Games 1 and 2 (instead of Game 1 only), there-by gaining home field advantage even though they were the lower seed.

Quarterfinals

Semifinals

Bracket

Match reports

Statistics

Transfers

References 

1981
Fort Lauderdale Strikers
Fort Lauderdale
Fort Lauderdale Strikers